Downinney is a hamlet in the civil parish of Warbstow, Cornwall, England. Downinney was recorded in the Domesday Book, 1086: there was land for 12 ploughs with 40 households. There was pasture of one square league and its value was reduced to 40 shillings per year (formerly 60 shillings i.e. £3).

References

Hamlets in Cornwall
Manors in Cornwall